John Everest (born 20 July 1908) was an Irish former professional footballer. During his career, he made over 100 appearances in the Football League.

Career
After beginning his career with non-league sides Dunnington and Heslington, Everest turned professional with York City in 1926 before joining Stockport County in 1928, scoring seven goals in seven matches for the Hatters including four during a 7–1 victory over Carlisle United on 18 January 1930. Originally playing as a forward, he converted to playing as a defender in 1931 while playing for Blackpool. Everest joined Cardiff City in 1934 following a recommendation from George Blackburn, who had seen Everest play against his Cheltenham Town side in the FA Cup. He was ever present in his debut season at Ninian Park, playing in each of the club's 47 matches in all competitions and remained first choice the following season, but with the club finishing in 19th and 20th position in his two seasons, Everest was one of a number of players released by manager Ben Watts-Jones in an attempt to improve the club's standings. He later played for Southend United and Barnsley.

References

1908 births
Irish Free State association footballers
York City F.C. players
Stockport County F.C. players
Rochdale A.F.C. players
Blackpool F.C. players
Cardiff City F.C. players
Southend United F.C. players
Barnsley F.C. players
English Football League players
Association football forwards
Association football defenders
Year of death missing
Association football players not categorized by nationality